Masafer Yatta (also spelled Mosfaret Yatta) is a collection of 19 Palestinian hamlets in the southern West Bank, in the Hebron Governorate of the State of Palestine, located between 14 and 24 kilometers south of the city of Hebron, in the southern Hebron Hills. The hamlets are situated within the municipal boundary of Yatta. The name "Masafer" is believed to derive from the Arabic words for "traveling," in light of the distance needed to travel from Yatta, or "nothing" in light of the local belief that "nothing" would be able to live in the area.

Population and administration 
According to the Palestinian Central Bureau of Statistics, six of the localities that make up Masafer Yatta (Mantiqat Shi'b al-Batim, Khirbet Tawil ash-Shih, Khirbet al-Fakhit, Khirbet Bir al-Idd, Khirbet Asafi and Maghayir al-Abeed) had a population of 768 in 2007. The 8 villages affected by a 2022 Israeli expulsion order have a population of 1,144, half of them children. Nearby at-Tuwani serves as a center for the Bedouin localities of Masafer Yatta. Masafer Yatta is administered by a local development committee whose members are appointed by the Ministry of Local Affairs of the Palestinian National Authority.

History
In 1881, the Palestine Exploration Fund (PEF) noted the following places:  meaning "the spur of the terebinth",  meaning "the peak or ridge of Artemisia", meaning "the ruin of the fissure", and
, meaning "the ruin of the perennial well".

At  PEF noted "traces of ruins, and a cistern",

Israeli occupation 
Since the Six-Day War in 1967, Masafer Yatta has been under Israeli occupation.

The hamlet cluster is part of "Area C", meaning that Israel has full military and civil control over it. The area is used by the army for military training and was denominated Firing Zone 918 by the Israeli army, after, according to a cabinet minute of 1981, Ariel Sharon had explicitly stated that the purpose of such a redefinition would be to enable the expulsion of the local Palestinian residents. More than one thousand Palestinians risk to be expelled from their homes and properties.

According to The Guardian, "Palestinian water cisterns, solar panels, roads and buildings here are frequently demolished on the grounds that they do not have building permits, which are nearly impossible to obtain, while surrounding illegal Israeli settlements flourish. The community are mostly herders, raising goats and sheep throughout scorching summers and freezing winters." Bir el-Eid, which is closest to the Israeli outpost Mitzpeh Yair, report having their cistern vandalized by having an animal carcass thrown into it. Palestinians claim that "the Israeli settlers were believed to be behind the vandalism".

Israeli authorities have attempted to relocate the residents to Yatta, arguing that hamlets in this area only sprung up in the 1980s, when people from Yatta "invaded" it after Israel's decision to declare it an IDF firing zone. The villagers appealed to the Israeli Supreme Court on the grounds that they have evidence of living in the area before the Israeli occupation. Their appeal is based on the fact that during the Israeli assault on Samu nearby, in 1966, the villagers of Jinba suffered damage, – the UN documented shortly after 15 houses that had been blown up by Israeli forces-and the damage was formally recognized soon after by the Jordanese government, which paid residents compensation for their losses in April and May 1967: 350 dinars per each stone house destroyed; 100 dinars for every killed camel, and seven for each sheep. It is argued to the contrary that what was blown up were Bedouin tents. Yet the Israeli geographer Natan Shalem, in his book Midbar Yehuda (Judean Desert) in 1931, stated that several villages there were not Bedouin nomadic encampments. Other evidence attests to the existence of inhabited sites outside Yatta-Jinba, Markaz, Al-Mafkara, Fakhit, Thaban, Al-Majaz, Sarura, Simra, Mughayer Al-Abid, Halawa, Sfei, Rakiz, Tuba, and Khalet a-Daba – long before the occupation.

Attack by Israeli settlers 

In September 2021, a mob of approximately 80 to 100 masked Israeli settlers invaded the village of Khirbat al-Mufkara, one of the hamlets that compose Masafer Yatta, throwing stones at houses and damaging cars; 12 Palestinians were injured, including a three-year-old Palestinian child who was hit in the head when an Israeli settler threw a stone at him while he was asleep inside his home.

Foreign Minister Yair Lapid reacted by calling it a "violent incident", "horrific, and it is terror. This isn't the Israeli way, and it isn't the Jewish way. This is a violent and dangerous fringe, and we have a responsibility to bring them to justice."

Forcible transfer 

In May 2022, the Israeli Supreme Court endorsed the IDF position regarding an area of 3,000 hectares in which 12 Palestinian villages are cited, paving the way for the expulsion of 1,000 residents, which would be the largest deportation since the 1970s. One of the judges involved in the ruling, David Mintz, resides in the Israeli settlement of Dolev in the West Bank. On 10 May, The European Union said "Settlement expansion, demolitions, and evictions are illegal under international law," and that setting up a firing zone is not an "imperative military reason" for transfer of an occupied population.

Once demolitions got underway, one family in one of the affected villages, Khribet al-Fakhiet, cleared out space in a cavern for themselves and their livestock to tide them over winter. The homes of 80 people in Khallet Athaba are scheduled to be bulldozed on 29 September 2022. Access to grazing land used by the shepherds has been, according to local herders, subsequently taken over by settlers, and both charities attempting to assist the affected communities and activists endeavouring to defend them from settlers have been denies permission to enter the zone's perimeter for lack of travel permits.

The United Nations states that Israeli actions could amount to a war crime. On 2 January 2023, B'Tselem described the expulsions as a "fast-track war crime".

In Nakba scholarship
Ilan Pappé's essay Everyday Evil in Palestine: The View from Lucifer's Hill looks at Masafer Yatta as a case study of the daily occurrences of "incremental colonization, ethnic cleansing, and oppression" that are emblematic of the ongoing Nakba of the Palestinian people. Lucifer Hill is a rise overlooking Masafer Yatta where Pappé notes "both the oppression and the resistance to it are visible", and where he notes that "all anyone needs to grasp the realities of this ongoing oppression is one hill, and one hour". It is also one of the places in the West Bank that Ariel Handel identified in 2009 in a "map of disaster".

Pappé charts the evolution of the efforts to drive Masafer Yatta's residents from the area, from the expropriation of Palestinian land by Israel by means of the World Zionist Organization and the Israeli government's designation of grazing lands as forbidden for human settlement to the more method of driving out the residents by destroying water facilities and declaring surrounding areas as firing zones. In what Pappé terms a method of ethnic cleansing, much of Masafer Yatta had already been declared a firing zone by 1977, codenamed Firing Zone 918, allowing the Israeli army to demolish houses, burn crops, stop wells and block access to fields – a method that has been used even more extensively since 1999.

References

Bibliography

External links
 Factsheet, Applied Research Institute–Jerusalem, ARIJ
 Massafer Yatta, aerial photo, ARIJ
 Survey of Western Palestine, Map 25: IAA, Wikimedia commons
 Bir al-'Id from Ta'ayush
 Bir el Id, from Rabbis for Human Rights, Israel
 Masafer Yatta, EAPPI

Hebron Governorate
Villages in the West Bank